James Farr (born November 2, 1992) is an American professional basketball player for Steaua Bucharest of the Liga Națională.
As a senior at  Xavier, Farr averaged 10.7 points and 7.8 and rebounds per game. The Musketeers went 28–6 after losing to Wisconsin in the second round of the NCAA Tournament. After the season he participated in the Portsmouth Invitational Tournament.

After going undrafted in the 2016 NBA draft, Farr signed with Alba Fehérvár of the Hungarian league. "It's very exciting, but there are some nerves knowing that I'm going to be living in a different country for a year," said Farr. In June 2017 he signed with Élan Chalon of the French side. Farr inked a one-year deal with Mitteldeutscher BC on August 10, 2018. In June 2019, he signed with the Magnolia Hotshots of the Philippine Basketball Association as their import for the 2019 PBA Commissioner's Cup.

On August 8, 2021, he has signed with Benfica of the Liga Portuguesa de Basquetebol.

References

External links
Xavier Musketeers bio

1992 births
Living people
American men's basketball players
American expatriate basketball people in Croatia
American expatriate basketball people in Germany
American expatriate basketball people in Hungary
American expatriate basketball people in France
American expatriate basketball people in the Philippines
Basketball players from Illinois
KK Zadar players
Magnolia Hotshots players
Mitteldeutscher BC players
Philippine Basketball Association imports
Power forwards (basketball)
S.L. Benfica basketball players
Sportspeople from Evanston, Illinois
Xavier Musketeers men's basketball players